The 1966 NHL Amateur Draft was the fourth NHL Entry Draft. It held at the Mount Royal Hotel in Montreal, Quebec.

Selections by round
Listed below are the selections in the 1966 NHL amateur draft.

Round one

Round two

Round three

Round four

See also
 1966–67 NHL season
 List of NHL players

References

External links
 1966 NHL amateur draft player stats at The Internet Hockey Database
 HockeyDraftCentral.com

Draft
National Hockey League Entry Draft